Caravan and the New Symphonia is a record by Caravan recorded on 28 October 1973 at the Theatre Royal in Drury Lane and originally released in 1974 on UK Decca's subsidiary Deram. Bringing the band and The New Symphonia Orchestra together for this recording was the work of Martyn Ford, conductor of the New Symphonia, and John G. Perry, who played bass with Caravan at the time. 
An expanded and re-ordered version was published in 2001. This version claims to have the tracks in the order as played.

Track listing (original issue) 
Side one

Side two

Track listing (re-issue)

Personnel 
Caravan
 Pye Hastings – guitar, vocals
 Geoff Richardson – electric viola
 Dave Sinclair – electric piano, organ, synthesizer
 John G. Perry – bass guitar, vocals
 Richard Coughlan – drums
 The New Symphonia Orchestra

Backing vocals
 Liza Strike
 Vicki Brown
 Margot Newman
 Helen Chappelle
 Tony Burrows
 Robert Lindop
 Danny Street

The New Symphonia
Martyn Ford (conductor), Richard Studt (leader), Irvine Arditti, Paul Beer, Ted Chance, Andrew Cauthery, Roger Chase, Lynden Cranham, Michael Crowther, Robin Davies, Rita Eddowes, Liz Edwards, Wilfred Gibson, Lucy Finch, Jo Frohlich, Wilf Gibson, Roy Gillard, Michael Harris, Tony Harris, Jimmy Hastings, Terry Johns, Skaila Kanda, Skaila Kanga, Garry Kettell, Chris Laurence, Helen Liebmann, Stephen May, Donald McVay, Dee Partridge, Geoff Perkins, Morris Pert, Mike Perton, Martin Robinson, Godfrey Salmon, Jan Schlapp, Colin Walker, Cathy Weiss, Robin Williams, Dave Woodcock, Nick Worters, Gavyn Wright.

References

External links 
 Caravan – Caravan & the New Symphonia (1974) album review by Lindsay Planer, credits & releases at AllMusic.com
 Caravan – Caravan & the New Symphonia (1974) album releases & credits at Discogs.com
 Caravan – Caravan & the New Symphonia (1974) album credits & user reviews at ProgArchives.com

Caravan (band) live albums
1974 live albums
Live albums recorded at the Theatre Royal, Drury Lane
Deram Records live albums
Albums produced by Dave Hitchcock